HappyCow is an online service that lists sources of vegan, vegetarian and healthy food.

Background and content

HappyCow was founded in 1999 as a world guide to vegetarian and vegan restaurants. The crowd-sourced site contains listings of over 50,000 businesses in 180 countries and more than 140,000 reviews. Restaurants are categorised as either vegan, vegetarian, or veg-friendly. The initial definition for veg-friendly was based on a minimum menu content being at least 60% vegetarian. This has since been modified into a more flexible set of guidelines based on the alternative availability of vegan food in the area. HappyCow's orientation has gravitated to be increasingly pro-vegan.

Other listings include health food shops, juice bars, vegan friendly accommodation, social and activity groups, catering operations and other entities with consideration for animal compassion. The website has forum and blog sections.

The HappyCow YouTube channel was launched in 2012.

Financing
Income generated is recycled into the running of the operation. Sources of website funding — now also IOS and Android apps — were and are advertisement, business sponsorship, and user contributions. In 2014, The HappyCow Cookbook: Recipes from Top-Rated Vegan Restaurants around the World was published.

Honours and awards
 Winner of eleven consecutive VegNews' Veggieawards as "Favorite Website" (most recently in 2017)
 Top 50 vegetarian blogs 2012, awarded by the Institute for the Psychology of Eating
 Top 100 vegetarian food websites, awarded by web100.com

References

External links 
 

Vegetarian publications and websites
Internet properties established in 1999
Veganism
Vegan cuisine
Consumer guides
IOS software
Android (operating system) software
1999 establishments in California